Federico Justiniano (born 18 July 1964) is a Bolivian footballer. He played in three matches for the Bolivia national football team in 1987. He was also part of Bolivia's squad for the 1987 Copa América tournament.

References

External links
 

1964 births
Living people
Association football midfielders
Bolivian footballers
Bolivia international footballers
Club Deportivo Guabirá managers
People from Obispo Santistevan Province